Nippon Badminton Association (NBA, 日本バドミントン協会; Nippon Badominton Kyōkai) is the national governing body for the sport of badminton in Japan.

History
Badminton competition in Japan started as early as 1919 from YMCA across major cities in Japan. The Nippon Badminton Association is formed in 1946 and the association later joined International Badminton Federation in 1952.

Tournaments
 Japan Open, an annual open tournament that attracts the world's elite players and currently part of BWF World Tour.
 Osaka International, an annual tournament held in Osaka since 2007.
 Akita Masters, new tournament held since 2018 and part of BWF World Tour.

References

National members of the Badminton World Federation
Badminton in Japan
Badminton
1946 establishments in Japan